Anapur is a village in Jaunpur, Uttar Pradesh, India.

Anapur village is located 12 mahrajganj block distance 12 km.

References 

Villages in Jaunpur district